Jordan Kenneth Willis (born 24 August 1994) is an English professional footballer who last played as a centre back for Sunderland. Previously, he spent 8 years in the English Football League with Coventry City.

Club career

Coventry City
Willis was born in Coventry, West Midlands. He made his first-team debut for Coventry City as a substitute on 5 November 2011 in a 4–2 Championship loss to Southampton, coming on to replace James McPake after 64 minutes. At the age of 17 years and 72 days he became the tenth youngest Coventry City player of all-time. He made his first start of the following season on 28 August 2012, in a 3–2 win against Birmingham City in the League Cup.

He established himself in the first-team towards the end of the 2013–14 season in the right-back position. A change in formation to a three-man defence saw Willis become a first-choice player for Coventry City at the start of the following season. On 11 October, Jordan Willis captained the Sky Blues for the first time in their game against Crewe Alexandra.

He scored his first goal for Coventry in an EFL Trophy tie against West Ham Under-23s on 30 August 2016. He then scored his first league goal for the club in a 2–0 win against Chesterfield on 1 November 2016.

Willis left Coventry at the end of 2018–19 season after rejecting the offer of a new contract.

Sunderland
Willis signed for League One club Sunderland on 13 July 2019 on a two-year contract. Willis scored his first goal for Sunderland on 17 August 2019, a header from a Grant Leadbitter corner, in a 2–1 home victory against Portsmouth. Sunderland announced on May 25, 2022, that he will be released when his contract runs out on June 30, 2022.

Wycombe Wanderers
Willis signed for Wycombe on February 11, 2023, until the end of the season.

International career
In February 2012 he was called up to the England under-18 team by manager Noel Blake. He made his debut on 7 March 2012 in a 3–0 win against Poland in Crewe. He made his England under-19 debut on 5 February 2013, in a 3–1 win against Denmark.

Career statistics

Honours
Coventry City
EFL Trophy: 2016–17
EFL League Two play-offs: 2018

Sunderland AFC
EFL Trophy: 2020–21

References

External links
Profile at the Sunderland A.F.C.website

1994 births
Living people
Footballers from Coventry
English footballers
England youth international footballers
Association football defenders
Coventry City F.C. players
Sunderland A.F.C. players
English Football League players